The year 1905 in Argentine football saw Alumni crowning Argentine champion, winning its 5th league title in six seasons. A new team, Reformer Athletic Club from the city of Campana, registered to play the tournament.

Primera División

The 1905 championship was expanded to include 7 teams, who played in a league format, with each team playing the other twice.

Final standings

Lower divisions

Primera B
Champion: América

Primera C
Champion: Alumni III

Domestic cup

Copa de Honor Municipalidad de Buenos Aires
Champion: Alumni

Final

International cups

Tie Cup
Champion:  Rosario AC

Final

Copa de Honor Cusenier
Champion:  Nacional

Final

Argentina national team
Argentina contested its first official tournament in 1905. The squad played Uruguay for Copa Lipton on 15 August 1905. The game ended 0-0 after extra time and the trophy was awarded to Uruguay as the visiting team.

Copa Lipton

Final

International friendlies 
English team Nottingham Forest toured on Argentina that year, playing several friendly matches v. clubs and  combined teams in Buenos Aires and Rosario.

Notes

References

 
Seasons in Argentine football